Kristine Rose is an American model and actress. She is best remembered for her role as "Miss July" in Demonic Toys. Rose is also noted for making several appearances in Playboy publications and videos. She was the covergirl on the May 1992 issue of the Spanish version of Playboy as well as the March 1991 Book of Lingerie in the US. Rose appeared in several music videos and in the 1994 Bench Warmer bikini trading card series.

Acting credits

Film
 11 Days, 11 Nights 2 - Sarah Asproon (1990)
 Passion's Flower - Linda (1991)
 Total Exposure - Rita (1991)
 Demonic Toys - Miss July (1992) 
 Round Trip to Heaven  - Tina (1982)
 Auntie Lee's Meat Pies - Fawn (1992)
 To Sleep with a Vampire - Prom Queen (1993)
 Save Me - Cheryl (1994)

Television
 1st & Ten ("If I Didn't Play Football") - Rachel (1990)
 Dark Justice ("Suitable for Framing") - (1993)
 After Hours - date unknown
 Out of This World - date unknown

Home video
 Playboy: Erotic Fantasies - Curio Shoppe (1992)
 Night Rhythms - Marilyn (1992)

Music videos
 "Jet City Woman" by Queensrÿche
 "Call It Rock n' Roll" by Great White
 Desert Moon by Great White
 Green-Tinted Sixties Mind by Mr. Big
 Save Me by The Rembrandts

Modeling

Playboy publications
Playboy's Book of Lingerie Vol. 18 March 1991 - cover.
Playboy's Bathing Beauties June 1992 - pages 10–11, 97
Playboy's Book of Lingerie Vol. 29 January 1993.
Playboy's Book of Lingerie Vol. 30 March 1993 - page 103.
Playboy's Bathing Beauties April 1993.
Playboy's Book of Lingerie Vol. 31 May 1993.
Playboy's Girls of Summer '93 June 1993 - page 72.
Playboy's Book of Lingerie Vol. 32 July 1993.
Playboy's Wet & Wild Women July 1993.
Playboy's Blondes, Brunettes & Redheads August 1993.
Playboy's Nudes December 1993 - pages 24, 103.
Playboy's Book of Lingerie Vol. 35 January 1994.
Playboy's Bathing Beauties March 1994 - page 21.
Playboy's Book of Lingerie Vol. 36 March 1994.
Playboy's Book of Lingerie Vol. 37 May 1994.

References

External links

American film actresses
American television actresses
Living people
American female models
20th-century American actresses
Year of birth missing (living people)
21st-century American women